Pat Rushin (born 1953) is an American screenwriter and creative writing professor at the University of Central Florida where he has served as the editor of The Florida Review. Rushin's novella, The Call, inspired the screenplay he wrote for The Zero Theorem directed by Terry Gilliam.

Career
Rushin attended the University of Dayton where he received a B.A. in English in 1976. He later attended Ohio State University where he obtained his masters in English in 1979. He graduated from Johns Hopkins University in 1982 with a masters in Creative Writing and Fiction.

In 1991, Rushin's book of short stories, Puzzling Through the News, was published by Galileo Press. The short film No Ordinary Sun (2004) was based on his short story "Speed of Light."

The original script for Rushin's first screenplay was written in 1999 and inspired by The Call. He submitted it to Project Greenlight, a television series produced by Matt Damon and Ben Affleck and the sci-fi film, directed by Terry Gilliam, was released in 2013.

In 2015, Rushin's novella The Call: A Virtual Parable was published by Burrow Press. His writing has also been included in literary magazines including Indiana Review, North American Review and American Literary Review.

Bibliography

Filmography
 No Ordinary Sun (2004)
 The Zero Theorem (2014)

References

External links

1953 births
Living people
American male screenwriters
University of Central Florida faculty
University of Dayton alumni
Ohio State University Graduate School alumni
Johns Hopkins University alumni
Screenwriters from Ohio
Screenwriters from Florida